HD 187086, also known as HR 7537, is a probable astrometric binary (87% chance) located in the southern constellation Telescopium. It has an average apparent magnitude of 5.9, making it faintly visible to the naked eye. At its current distance, HD 187086's brightness is diminished by 0.27 magnitudes due to interstellar dust. It has an absolute magnitude of −0.8.

The primary has a stellar classification of M1 III, indicating that it is a red giant. It is currently on the asymptotic giant branch, fusing hydrogen and helium shells around an inert carbon core. It has 1.76 times the mass of the Sun but it has expanded to 111 times the solar radius. HD 187086 is particularly metal enriched ([Fe/H] = +0.24).

HD 187086 fluctuates between 5.95 and 6.07 and its variability was first noticed by P.M. Corben in 1971 after being listed as an ordinary M-type giant a year prior. In 2002, Chris Koen and Laurent Eyer reported that the Hipparcos data shows periodic fluctuations with an amplitude of 0.023 magnitudes, and a period of 7.6805 days. As of 2004 however, it is not confirmed to be variable.

References

M-type giants
Suspected variables
Astrometric binaries
Telescopium (constellation)
187086
095798
CD-47 13103
7537
Asymptotic-giant-branch stars
Telescopii, 69